Laetitia Nourrissat Toureaux (Oyace, 11 September 1907 – Paris, 16 May 1937) was a murder victim. She was found dead in a Paris Métro carriage at Porte Dorée on 16 May 1937. This crime was widely discussed at the time, and the interwar period generated multiple speculations, involving the secret services and the violent political group La Cagoule. Toureaux entered an unoccupied metro car at one stop, and was found stabbed to death less than 90 seconds later at the next stop.

Toureaux was the first person to be killed on the Paris Métro. Police investigations, led by Commissioner Badin,  found that the victim was leading a double life, and that her entire family, originally from Italy, had relocated to France. Many Italians came to Paris at the time in search of work. Toureaux worked during the day in a factory, but was found to also be working under a false name as an attendant at a dance hall with a seedy reputation, and frequently making discreet visits to the Italian Embassy. She was known to have had various lovers, leading police to initially suspect a crime of passion. However, further investigation revealed she had been working as a spy. She had been employed to infiltrate La Cagoule, a far-right terrorist group that was often overlooked later in post-war France. The case was dropped two years later at the outbreak of the Second World War.

Adaptation
On 29 June 1978, one episode of the French TV series De mémoire d'homme (From man's memory) was based on the murder of Laetitia Toureaux. The episode was named L'affaire Laetitia Toureaux ou Le crime parfait.  A book named Murder in a Metro (The case of Laetitia Toureaux or the perfect crime) was written about the crime.

See also
List of unsolved murders
Locked-room mystery

References

External links
IMDB link of 1978 TV episode

1937 deaths
1937 murders in France
Deaths by stabbing in France
Female murder victims
People murdered in France
Unsolved murders in France
Violence against women in France
Paris Métro line 8